CAX may refer tco:

 Carlisle Lake District Airport in Carlisle, Cumbria, England (IATA airport code: CAX)
 Combined arms Exercise (abbreviated as CAX)
 Computer-aided technologies (sometimes abbreviated as CAx) 
 Container Availability Index (abbreviated as CAx)